Southwark News is a weekly local newspaper based in Southwark, south London, England. It is the only independent, paid-for newspaper in London. The newspaper is owned and run by Southwark Newspaper Limited, based in Bermondsey.

Southwark News was founded by Dave Clark as the Bermondsey News in 1987, later expanding to the borough and the surrounding area. It was funded for a time by Barry Albin-Dyer. In 2002, Albin-Dyer offered his share of the newspaper to Kevin Quinn and Chris Mullany, which they accepted.

See also
 List of newspapers in London

References

External links 

 Southwark News website

Year of establishment missing
London newspapers
Media and communications in the London Borough of Southwark
Weekly newspapers published in the United Kingdom